The Royal Institute of Health Sciences (RIHS) is one of two main medical education centers in Bhutan, the other being the Institute of Traditional Medicine Services. The RIHS was established in Thimphu in 1974 as a member college of the Royal University of Bhutan, and is associated with the National Referral Hospital.  The RIHS offers diploma and certificate programmes for nurses, medical technicians and other primary health care workers.  The institute received the World Health Organization's 50th Anniversary Award for Primary Health Care in 1998. 
Health infrastructure is improving in Bhutan and there is growing number of trained human resources, but the country still had only 2 doctors per 10,000 population in 2005. 
The RIHS cannot train doctors, so Bhutan must send candidates to neighboring countries such as Bangladesh, India, Myanmar and Sri Lanka for their MBBS course.

Courses

Nursing

The institute trains auxiliary nurse midwives, general nurse midwives and assistant nurses. 
A joint initiative between La Trobe University, the World Health Organization and the Royal Government of Bhutan gives Bhutanese qualified nurses the opportunity to obtain a bachelor's degree. 
Students who successfully complete this program are eligible to apply for postgraduate studies in Australia.

Pharmacy

The RIHS conducts a two-year Pharmacy Technician Course, teaching students pharmacy and pharmacology, with basic introductions to  physiology, anatomy, health education, first aid etc. Other health work trainees are also taught pharmacology and pharmacy on similar lines.

Physiotherapy

The RIHS offers a 2 years of certificate program in Physiotherapy, following which the students work for a few more months in the general referral hospital, and are then sent out to provide services in various districts across the country.

Other Courses

The institute also trains health assistants, basic health workers, and technicians of various other disciplines such as laboratory, dental, medical radiography, ophthalmology and operation theater.

References

Universities in Bhutan
Medical schools in Bhutan
1974 establishments in Bhutan
Educational institutions established in 1974